Bruce's green pigeon (Treron waalia), also known as the yellow-bellied fruit pigeon, is a species of bird in the family Columbidae.
It is found in Benin, Burkina Faso, Cameroon, Central African Republic, Chad, Democratic Republic of the Congo, Ivory Coast, Djibouti, Eritrea, Ethiopia, Gambia, Ghana, Guinea, Guinea-Bissau, Kenya, Mali, Mauritania, Niger, Nigeria, Oman, Saudi Arabia, Senegal, Somalia, Sudan, Togo, Uganda, and Yemen.  It is a frugivore bird species that specialises on eating the fruits of a single species of fig tree, Ficus platphylla.

Description 
Despite its name, the Bruce's green pigeon is not green but is grey with a light yellow breast instead.

References

Bruce's green pigeon
Birds of Sub-Saharan Africa
Birds of the Middle East
Bruce's green pigeon
Taxonomy articles created by Polbot